"Lord Give Me a Sign" is a song by American hip hop recording artist DMX, released as the second single from his sixth studio album Year of the Dog... Again (2006).

Song Info

Even though the album's cover has the RIAA Parental Advisory sticker, this song is entirely free of profanity. This is most likely due to DMX's reputation. DMX has since decided to return to rap after being encouraged by Mase to wait for God's calling to do so. It is also rumored that DMX made this song because he needs a sign to preach or stay rapping. The song was produced by Scott Storch.

Meaning
The song is about how DMX struggles with "trials and tribulations" throughout his life, all the while seeking strength from God to win the battles he faces.

Music video
The video of the song shows DMX in a desert, perhaps trying to reenact the story of how Jesus spent forty days and nights in the desert. It also shows pictures of hurricane stricken Louisiana and other emotive images.

In popular culture
 The song has been used as the main theme for DMX: Soul of a Man.
 It has been featured in advertisements for the CBS television series The Unit
 In the trailer for the movie Alpha Dog.
 This song is also featured in an episode in season 4 of "The Wire"
 In episode 15 ("Blinders") in season 1 of "Friday Night Lights".
 The song was played during the end credits of the 2009 film Not Easily Broken.

Charts

References 

2006 singles
DMX (rapper) songs
Hurricane Katrina disaster relief charity singles
Music videos directed by Chris Robinson (director)
Song recordings produced by Scott Storch
Songs written by Scott Storch
Columbia Records singles
Ruff Ryders Entertainment singles
2006 songs
Songs written by DMX (rapper)